ISAM-140 is a selective non-xanthinic adenosine A2B receptor atagonist. Discovered in 2016, has a Ki of 3.49 nM in A2B receptor and >1000-fold selectivity with respect to the other three adenosine receptor subtypes. It has been shown to help immune system to attack cancer cells in in vitro assays, by rescuing T and NK cell proliferation, cytokine release and TIL infiltration.

References 

2-Furyl compounds
Esters
Nitrogen heterocycles
Heterocyclic compounds with 3 rings